Jonathan Vincent Voight (born December 29, 1938) is an American actor. He came to prominence in the late 1960s with his Academy Award–nominated performance as Joe Buck, a would-be gigolo, in Midnight Cowboy (1969). During the 1970s, he became a Hollywood star with his portrayals of a businessman mixed up with murder in Deliverance (1972); a paraplegic Vietnam veteran in Coming Home (1978), for which he won an Academy Award for Best Actor; and a penniless ex–boxing champion in the remake of The Champ (1979).

Voight's output became sparse during the 1980s and early 1990s, although he won a Golden Globe Award and was nominated for an Academy Award for his performance as the ruthless bank robber Oscar "Manny" Manheim in Runaway Train (1985). He made a comeback in Hollywood during the mid-1990s, starring alongside Sam Neill in the film The Rainbow Warrior (1993) about the French bombing of the eponymous ship in Auckland, and in Michael Mann's crime epic Heat (1995) opposite Robert De Niro and Al Pacino. He portrayed Jim Phelps in Mission: Impossible (1996), a corrupt NSA agent in Enemy of the State (1998), and the unscrupulous attorney Leo F. Drummond in Francis Ford Coppola's The Rainmaker (1997), which earned him a Golden Globe nomination for Best Supporting Actor.

Voight gave critically acclaimed biographical performances during the 2000s, appearing as sportscaster Howard Cosell in Ali (2001) for which his supporting performance was nominated for the Academy Award, the Golden Globe Award and a Critics Choice Award, and also as Nazi officer Jürgen Stroop in Uprising (2001), as Franklin D. Roosevelt in Michael Bay's Pearl Harbor (2001) and as Pope John Paul II in the eponymous miniseries (2005). Voight also appeared in the Baby Geniuses and National Treasure film series, as well as Showtime's television series Ray Donovan as Mickey Donovan, a role that brought him newfound critical and audience acclaim and his fourth Golden Globe win in 2014. He also appeared as an antagonist on the thriller series 24 in its seventh season.

Voight is the winner of one Academy Award, having been nominated for four. He has also won four Golden Globe Awards and has been nominated for eleven. On November 21, 2019, he was awarded the National Medal of Arts. He is the father of actress Angelina Jolie and actor James Haven.

Early life and education 
Jonathan Vincent Voight was born on December 29, 1938, in Yonkers, New York, to Barbara and Elmer Voight, a professional golfer. He has two brothers, Barry Voight, a former volcanologist at Pennsylvania State University, and James Wesley Voight, known as Chip Taylor, a singer-songwriter who wrote "Wild Thing" and "Angel of the Morning". Voight's paternal grandfather and his paternal grandmother's parents were Slovak immigrants, while his maternal grandfather and his maternal grandmother's parents were German immigrants. Political activist Joseph P. Kamp was his great-uncle through his mother.

Voight was raised as a Catholic and attended Archbishop Stepinac High School in White Plains, New York, where he first took an interest in acting, playing the comedic role of Count Pepi Le Loup in the school's annual musical, The Song of Norway. Following his graduation in 1956, he enrolled at The Catholic University of America in Washington, D.C., where he majored in art and graduated with a B.A. in 1960. After graduation, Voight moved to New York City, where he pursued an acting career. He graduated from the Neighborhood Playhouse School of the Theatre, where he studied under Sanford Meisner.

Acting career

1960s
In the early 1960s, Voight found work in television, appearing in several episodes of Gunsmoke, between 1963 and 1968, as well as guest spots on Naked City and The Defenders, both in 1963, and Twelve O'Clock High, in 1966 and Cimarron Strip in 1968.

Voight's theater career took off in January 1965, playing Rodolfo in Arthur Miller's A View from the Bridge in an Off-Broadway revival.

Voight's film debut did not come until 1967, when he took a part in Phillip Kaufman's crimefighter spoof, Fearless Frank. He also took a small role in 1967's western, Hour of the Gun, directed by veteran helmer John Sturges. In 1968 he took a role in director Paul Williams's Out of It.

In 1969, Voight was cast in the groundbreaking Midnight Cowboy, a film that would make his career. He played Joe Buck, a naïve male hustler from Texas, adrift in New York City. He comes under the tutelage of Dustin Hoffman's Ratso Rizzo, a tubercular petty thief and con artist. The film explored late 1960s New York and the development of an unlikely, but poignant friendship between the two main characters. Directed by John Schlesinger and based on a novel by James Leo Herlihy, the film struck a chord with critics and audiences. Because of its controversial themes, the film was released with an X rating and would make history by being the only X-rated feature to win Best Picture at the Academy Awards. Both Voight and co-star Hoffman were nominated for Best Actor, but lost out to John Wayne in True Grit.

1970s
In 1970, Voight appeared in Mike Nichols' adaptation of Catch-22, and re-teamed with director Paul Williams to star in The Revolutionary, as a left-wing college student struggling with his conscience.

Voight next starred in 1972's Deliverance. Directed by John Boorman, from a script that James Dickey had helped to adapt from his own novel of the same name, it tells the story of a canoe trip in a feral, backwoods America. Both the film and the performances of Voight and co-star Burt Reynolds received great critical acclaim, and were popular with audiences.

Voight also appeared at the Studio Arena Theater, in Buffalo, New York, in the Tennessee Williams play A Streetcar Named Desire from 1973 to 1974 as Stanley Kowalski.

Voight played a directionless young boxer in 1973's The All American Boy, then appeared in the 1974 film Conrack, directed by Martin Ritt. Based on Pat Conroy's autobiographical novel The Water Is Wide, Voight portrayed the title character, an idealistic young schoolteacher sent to teach underprivileged black children on a remote South Carolina island. The same year he appeared in The Odessa File, based on Frederick Forsyth's thriller, as Peter Miller, a young German journalist who discovers a conspiracy to protect former Nazis still operating within Germany. This film first teamed him with the actor-director Maximilian Schell, who acted out a character named and based on the "Butcher of Riga" Eduard Roschmann, and for whom Voight would appear in 1976's End of the Game, a psychological thriller based on a story by Swiss novelist and playwright Friedrich Dürrenmatt.

Voight was Steven Spielberg's first choice for the role of Matt Hooper in the 1975 film Jaws, but he turned down the role, which was ultimately played by Richard Dreyfuss.

In 1978, Voight portrayed the paraplegic Vietnam veteran Luke Martin in Hal Ashby's film Coming Home, and was awarded Best Actor at the Cannes Film Festival, for his portrait of a cynical, yet noble paraplegic, reportedly based on real-life Vietnam veteran-turned-antiwar-activist Ron Kovic, with whom Jane Fonda's character falls in love. The film included a much-talked-about love scene between the two. Fonda won her second Best Actress award for her role, and Voight won for Best Actor in a Leading Role at the Oscars.

In 1979, Voight once again put on boxing gloves, starring in 1979's remake of the 1931 Wallace Beery and Jackie Cooper vehicle The Champ, with Voight playing the part of an alcoholic ex-heavyweight and a young Ricky Schroder playing the role of his adoring son. The film was an international success, but less popular with American audiences.

1980s

He next reteamed with director Ashby in 1982's Lookin' to Get Out, in which he played Alex Kovac, a con man who has run into debt with New York mobsters and hopes to win enough in Las Vegas to pay them off. Voight both co-wrote the script and also co-produced. He also produced and acted in 1983's Table for Five, in which he played a widower bringing up his children by himself.

Also in 1983, Voight was slated to play Robert Harmon in John Cassavetes' Golden Bear-winning Love Streams, having performed the role on stage in 1981. However, a few weeks before shooting began, Voight announced that he also wanted to direct the picture and was consequently dropped.

In 1985, Voight teamed up with Russian writer and director Andrei Konchalovsky to play the role of escaped con Oscar "Manny" Manheim in Runaway Train. The script was based on a story by Akira Kurosawa, and paired Voight with Eric Roberts as a fellow escapee. Voight received an Academy Award nomination for Best Actor and won the Golden Globe's award for Best Actor. Roberts was also honored for his performance, receiving an Academy Award nomination for Best Supporting Actor.

Voight followed up this and other performances with a role in the 1986 film, Desert Bloom, and reportedly experienced a "spiritual awakening" toward the end of the decade. In 1989 Voight starred in and helped write Eternity, which dealt with a television reporter's efforts to uncover corruption.

1990s
He made his first acting debut into television films, acting in 1991's Chernobyl: The Final Warning, followed by The Last of his Tribe, in 1992. He followed with 1992's The Rainbow Warrior for ABC, the story of the ill-fated Greenpeace ship sunk by French operatives in Auckland Harbour. For the remainder of the decade, Voight would alternate between feature films and television movies, including a starring role in the 1993 miniseries Return to Lonesome Dove, a continuation of Larry McMurtry's western saga, 1989's Lonesome Dove. Voight played Captain Woodrow F. Call, the part played by Tommy Lee Jones in the original miniseries. Voight made a cameo appearance as himself on the Seinfeld episode "The Mom & Pop Store" airing November 17, 1994, in which George Costanza buys a car that appears to be owned by Jon Voight. Voight described the process leading up to the episode in an interview on the Red Carpet at the 2006 BAFTA Emmy Awards:

Well what happened was I was asked to be on Seinfeld. They said: "Would you do a Seinfeld?" And I said, and I just happened to know to see a few Seinfelds and I knew these guys were really tops; they were really, really clever guys, and I liked the show. And so I said "Sure!" and I thought they would ask me to do a walk-on, the way it came: "Would you come be part of the show?" And I said "Yeah, sure I'll do it." You know what I mean? Then I got the script and my name was on every page because it was about my car. And I laughed; it was hysterically funny. So I was really delighted to do it. The writer came up to me and he said "Jon, would you come take a look at my car to see if you ever owned it?", because the writer wrote it from a real experience where someone sold him the car based on the fact that it was my car. And I went down and I looked at the car and I said "No, I never had this car." So unfortunately I had to give him the bad news. But it was a funny episode.

In 1992, Voight appeared in the HBO film The Last of His Tribe.

In 1995, Voight played the role of "Nate", a sophisticated fence, in the crime drama film Heat, directed by Michael Mann, and appeared in the television films Convict Cowboy and The Tin Soldier, also directing the latter film.

Voight next appeared in 1996's blockbuster film Mission: Impossible, directed by Brian De Palma and starring Tom Cruise. Voight played the role of spymaster James Phelps, a role originated by Peter Graves in the television series.

In 1997, Voight appeared in six films, beginning with Rosewood, based on the 1923 destruction of the primarily black town of Rosewood, Florida, by the white residents of nearby Sumner. Voight played John Wright, a white Rosewood storeowner who follows his conscience and protects his black customers from the white rage. He next appeared in Anaconda, set in the Amazon; he played Paul Sarone, a snake hunter obsessed with a fabled giant anaconda, who hijacks an unwitting National Geographic film crew who are looking for a remote Indian tribe. Voight next appeared in a supporting role in Oliver Stone's U Turn, portraying a blind man. He took a supporting role in The Rainmaker, adopted from the John Grisham novel and directed by Francis Ford Coppola. He played an unscrupulous lawyer representing an insurance company, facing off with a neophyte lawyer played by Matt Damon. His last film of 1997 was Boys Will Be Boys, a family comedy directed by Dom DeLuise.

The following year, Voight had the lead role in the television film The Fixer, in which he played Jack Killoran, a lawyer who crosses ethical lines in order to "fix" things for his wealthy clients. A near-fatal accident awakens his dormant conscience and Killoran soon runs afoul of his former clients. He also took a substantial role in Tony Scott's 1998 political thriller, Enemy of the State, in which he played Will Smith's character's stalwart antagonist from the NSA .

Voight was reunited with director Boorman in 1998's The General. Set in Dublin, Ireland, the film tells the true-life story of the charismatic leader of a gang of thieves, Martin Cahill, at odds with both the police and the Provisional IRA. Voight portrays Inspector Ned Kenny, determined to bring Cahill to justice.

He next appeared in 1999's Varsity Blues. He played a blunt, autocratic football coach, pitted in a test of wills against his star player, portrayed by James Van Der Beek. Produced by fledgling MTV Pictures, the film became a surprise hit and helped connect Voight with a younger audience.

Voight played Noah in the 1999 television production Noah's Ark, and appeared in Second String, also for TV. He also appeared with Cheryl Ladd in the feature A Dog of Flanders, a remake of a popular film set in Belgium.

2000s
Voight next portrayed President Franklin D. Roosevelt in 2001's action/war film Pearl Harbor, having accepted the role when Gene Hackman declined (his performance was received favorably by critics). Also that year, he appeared as Lord Croft, father of the title character of Lara Croft: Tomb Raider. Based on the popular video game, the digital adventuress was played on the big screen by Voight's own real-life daughter Angelina Jolie.

That year, he also appeared in Zoolander, directed by Ben Stiller who starred as the title character, a vapid supermodel with humble roots. Voight appeared as Zoolander's coal-miner father. The film extracted both pathos and cruel humor from the scenes of Zoolander's return home, when he entered the mines alongside his father and brothers and Voight's character expressed his unspoken disgust at his son's chosen profession.

Also in 2001, Voight joined Leelee Sobieski, Hank Azaria and David Schwimmer in the made-for-television film Uprising, which was based on the uprising in the Warsaw ghetto. Voight played Major-General Juergen Stroop, the German officer responsible for the destruction of the Jewish resistance, and received a Primetime Emmy Award nomination for Outstanding Supporting Actor in a Limited Series or Movie

Director Michael Mann tagged Voight for a supporting role in the 2001 biopic Ali, which starred Will Smith as the controversial former heavyweight champ, Muhammad Ali. Voight was almost unrecognizable under his make-up and toupée, as he impersonated the sports broadcaster Howard Cosell. Voight received his fourth Academy Award nomination, this time for Best Actor in a Supporting Role, for his performance.

Also in 2001, he appeared in the television mini-series Jack and the Beanstalk: The Real Story along with Vanessa Redgrave, Matthew Modine, Richard Attenborough, and Mia Sara.

In 2003, he played the role of Marion Sevillo/Mr. Sir in Holes. In 2004, Voight joined Nicolas Cage, in National Treasure as Patrick Gates, the father of Cage's character. In 2005, he played the title role in the second part of CBS' miniseries, Pope John Paul II. In 2006, he was Kentucky Wildcats head coach Adolph Rupp in the Disney hit Glory Road. In 2007, he played United States Secretary of Defense John Keller in the summer blockbuster Transformers, reuniting him with Holes star Shia LaBeouf. Also in 2007, Voight reprised his role as Patrick Gates in National Treasure: Book of Secrets. He appeared in Bratz with his goddaughter Skyler Shaye.

In 2009, Voight played Jonas Hodges, the American antagonist, in the seventh season of the hit Fox drama 24, a role that many argue is based on real life figures Alfried Krupp, Johann Rall and Erik Prince. Voight plays the chief executive officer of a fictional private military company based in northern Virginia called Starkwood, which has loose resemblances to Academi and ThyssenKrupp. Voight made his first appearance in the two-hour prequel episode 24: Redemption on November 23. He then went on to recur for 10 episodes of Season 7. He joined Dennis Haysbert as the only two actors ever to have been credited with the "Special Guest Appearance" card on 24. That same year Voight also lent his voice talents in the Thomas Nelson audio Bible production known as The Word of Promise. In this dramatized audio, Voight played the character of Abraham. The project also featured a large ensemble of other well-known Hollywood actors including Jim Caviezel, Louis Gossett Jr., John Rhys-Davies, Luke Perry, Gary Sinise, Jason Alexander, Christopher McDonald, Marisa Tomei and John Schneider.

2010s

In 2013, Voight made his much-acclaimed appearance on Ray Donovan as Mickey Donovan, the main character's conniving father. He received a Golden Globe Award for Best Supporting Actor – Series, Miniseries or Television Film in 2014 for his work on Ray Donovan.

On March 26, 2019, Voight was appointed to a six-year term on the Board of Trustees of the Kennedy Center in Washington DC.

2020s
In 2022, Voight was cast in an Upcoming Role in Megalopolis, directed by Francis Ford Coppola

Political views

In his early life, Voight's political views aligned with American liberal views, and he supported President John F. Kennedy, describing his assassination as traumatizing to people at that time. He also worked for George McGovern's voter registrations efforts in the inner cities of Los Angeles. Voight actively protested against the Vietnam War. In the 1970s, he made public appearances alongside Jane Fonda and Leonard Bernstein in support of the leftist Popular Unity group in Chile.

In a July 28, 2008, op-ed in The Washington Times, Voight wrote that he regretted his youthful anti-war activism, and claimed that the peace movement of that time was driven by "Marxist propaganda."  He also claimed that the radicals in the peace movement were responsible for the communists coming to power in Vietnam and Cambodia and for failing to stop the subsequent slaughter of 1.5 million people in the Killing Fields.

In the same op-ed, Voight also criticized the Democratic Party and Barack Obama's bid to become president, claiming that the Democrats had created "a propaganda campaign with subliminal messages, creating a God-like figure (Obama)" who would "demoralize this country and help create a socialist America." He claimed that Obama had grown up with the teachings of very angry, militant white and black people around him.

Voight endorsed Republican presidential nominees Mitt Romney and Donald Trump in the 2012 and 2016 presidential elections respectively. Speaking at an inauguration rally for Donald Trump in January 2017, Voight said, "God answered all our prayers" by granting Trump the White House. In May 2019, Voight released a short two-part video on Twitter supporting President Trump's policies, and calling him "the greatest president since Abraham Lincoln."

In November 2020, after the United States presidential election, Voight released a statement through his Twitter account, in which he stated he was very angry that Joe Biden had won the election. He further implied that Biden had committed electoral fraud and proclaimed that the United States was engaged in "our greatest fight since the Civil War – the battle of righteousness versus Satan, because these leftists are evil, corrupt, and they want to tear down this nation." He finished the statement by imploring his followers to not let the 2020 presidential election be certified without attempting to make sure it was accurate first. After the January 6 United States Capitol attack, and after Joe Biden's victory was confirmed in Congress on January 7, Voight released one more video on his Twitter account for his followers telling them to cease protesting. He proceeded to tell his followers "We shall not weep," to "give thanks to Donald Trump" for his "four years of hard work" as president of the United States, and that the complaints of those who were disappointed in his reelection loss "would be heard." He then concluded his video by calling for peace to all Americans.

In 2022, following a mass shooting at an elementary school in Uvalde, Texas, in a Facebook video, Voight called for gun control, arguing that "proper qualifications" and "testing" should be necessary for gun ownership.

Personal life
In 1962, Voight married actress Lauri Peters, whom he met when they both appeared in the original Broadway production of The Sound of Music. They divorced in 1967. He married actress Marcheline Bertrand in 1971. They separated in 1976, filed for divorce in 1978, and it was finalized in 1980. Their children, James Haven (born May 11, 1973) and Angelina Jolie (born June 4, 1975), went on to enter the film business as actors and producers. Through Jolie, he has six grandchildren.

Voight has never remarried in the 40-plus years since his second divorce. Over the decades, he has dated Linda Morand, Stacey Pickren, Rebecca De Mornay, Eileen Davidson, Barbra Streisand, Nastassja Kinski, and Diana Ross.

Filmography

Film

Television

Awards and nominations

See also 
List of actors with Academy Award nominations
List of actors with two or more Academy Award nominations in acting categories

References

Further reading

External links

 
 
 
 
 

1938 births
20th-century American male actors
21st-century American male actors
American Christian Zionists
American male film actors
American male stage actors
American male television actors
American people of German descent
American people of Slovak descent
BAFTA Most Promising Newcomer to Leading Film Roles winners
Best Actor Academy Award winners
Best Drama Actor Golden Globe (film) winners
Best Supporting Actor Golden Globe (television) winners
Cannes Film Festival Award for Best Actor winners
Archbishop Stepinac High School alumni
Catholic University of America alumni
Lee Strasberg Theatre and Film Institute alumni
Living people
Male actors from New York (state)
Neighborhood Playhouse School of the Theatre alumni
New Star of the Year (Actor) Golden Globe winners
New York (state) Republicans
People from Yonkers, New York
Jon
United States National Medal of Arts recipients